Alvin Henry Haymond (born August 31, 1942) is a former American football defensive back who played ten seasons in the National Football League.

Career
Haymond led the NFL three times in punt return yardage and once in kickoff return yardage.  He played college football at Southern University and was drafted in the eighteenth round of the 1964 NFL Draft.

1942 births
Living people
Players of American football from New Orleans
American football defensive backs
American football return specialists
Southern Jaguars football players
Baltimore Colts players
Houston Oilers players
Los Angeles Rams players
Philadelphia Eagles players
Washington Redskins players